The Kazhuoish languages are a branch of Loloish languages proposed by Lama (2012). There are five languages.
Katso
Samu
Sanie
Sadu
Meuma

Samei may or may not be a Kazhuoish language.

However, Bradley (2007) classifies the Kazhuoish languages as Northern Loloish, and considers Samu and Sanie to be closely related to Nasu.

References